Following the death of State President Nicolaas Diederichs on August 21, 1978, a new election for the South African head of state was held which pitted former Prime Minister John Vorster, backed by the then-ruling National Party, against former United Party leader De Villiers Graaff supported by the New Republic Party, and Vice-Chancellor of the University of the Witwatersrand, Guerino Bozzoli, supported by the Progressive Federal Party. In accordance with the South African Constitution of 1961, the ceremonial State President was elected by a joint sitting of both houses of Parliament for a seven-year term. John Vorster won the election with 173 votes in his favor and 31 going to the other candidates, beginning his term on October 10, 1978.

Bibliography 

Presidential elections in South Africa
1978 elections in South Africa